Charles Malet or Mallet may refer to:

Sir Charles Malet, 1st Baronet (1752–1815), diplomat
Sir Charles St Lo Malet, 6th Baronet (1906–1918), of the Malet baronets
Charles Mallet (1862–1947), British historian and politician